Heliogabalus may refer to:

 Elagabalus (–222), Roman Emperor 
 Elagabalus (deity), a Syro-Roman sun god
 Heliogabalus, a fictional character in Philip K. Dick's novel Martian Time-Slip